New York State Route 9A (NY 9A) is a state highway in the vicinity of New York City in the United States. Its southern terminus is at Battery Place near the northern end of the Brooklyn–Battery Tunnel in New York City, where it intersects with both the unsigned Interstate 478 (I-478) and FDR Drive. The northern terminus of NY 9A is at U.S. Route 9 (US 9) in Peekskill. It is predominantly an alternate route of US 9 between New York City and Peekskill; however, in New York City, it is a major route of its own as it runs along the West Side Highway and Henry Hudson Parkway. It is also one of only two signed New York State routes in Manhattan (the other is NY 25). In northern Westchester County, NY 9A follows the Briarcliff–Peekskill Parkway.

The origins of NY 9A date back to the 1920s when an alternate route of then-NY 6 from Yonkers to Tarrytown was designated as NY 6A. NY 6 was redesignated as US 9 in 1927; however, NY 6A was not renumbered to NY 9A until the 1930 renumbering of state highways in New York. NY 9A was extended south into New York City in 1934 and north to Ossining in the late 1930s. In 1933, the Briarcliff–Peekskill Parkway opened as NY 404. All of NY 404 was incorporated into an extended NY 9A on January 1, 1949. NY 9A was extended northward to Peekskill in 1967 following the completion of the Croton Expressway and southward to the Brooklyn–Battery Tunnel in the mid-1990s.

Route description

NY 9A begins in Lower Manhattan at Battery Place near the north end of the Brooklyn–Battery Tunnel (unsigned I-478) and heads north on the surface West Side Highway and Henry Hudson Parkway, crossing US 9 for the first time at the east end of the George Washington Bridge. After crossing into the Bronx via the Triborough Bridge and Tunnel Authority-owned Henry Hudson Bridge, NY 9A proceeds to leave the parkway at exit 23, joining US 9 on Broadway. The portions of NY 9A between Lower Manhattan and 72nd Street, and from 125th Street to the New York City line (with the exception of the Henry Hudson Bridge) are owned by the New York State Department of Transportation, the portion between 72nd and 125th Streets is owned by the New York City Department of Parks & Recreation and the entire highway within city limits is maintained on a daily basis by the New York City Department of Transportation. The concurrency between US 9 and NY 9A runs for  within the city of Yonkers. All of NY 9A within Yonkers is maintained by the city.

NY 9A separates from US 9 along Ashburton Avenue and heads north as Saw Mill River Road. It parallels the Saw Mill River Parkway through Ardsley and Elmsford, to the west side of Hawthorne. The route meets the southbound New York State Thruway (I-87) at a partial interchange and later meets I-287 (the Cross-Westchester Expressway) at a full interchange that provides a route to the northbound Thruway (I-87). NY 100 merges with NY 9A to form a  concurrency carrying the names Saw Mill River Road and Briarcliff–Peekskill Parkway, parallel to the Taconic State Parkway. NY 9A exits off this highway along the Briarcliff–Peekskill Parkway, while NY 100 continues straight as Saw Mill River Road. NY 9A merges to form a brief concurrency with US 9 as the Croton Expressway in Ossining just south of the Croton River.

The second concurrency between US 9 and NY 9A runs for 1.10 miles, with NY 9A leaving the Croton Expressway at NY 129 in Croton-on-Hudson. The highway heads north along Riverside Avenue and eventually joins old Albany Post Road. After crossing US 9 once more in Cortlandt, NY 9A ends at the Welcher Avenue interchange in southern Peekskill.

History

Origins
Prior to the establishment of the U.S. Highway System, US 9 was designated as NY 6. An alternate route from Yonkers to Tarrytown was assigned the NY 6A designation by 1926. This ran along the present alignment of NY 9A from Yonkers to north of Elmsford, where it turned west on Old Saw Mill River Road, Neperan Road, County House Road and Bedford Road to end at NY 6 in Tarrytown. NY 6 was redesignated as US 9 when U.S. Highways were first posted in New York in 1927; however, NY 6A was not renumbered at this time. It was finally renumbered to NY 9A as part of the 1930 renumbering of state highways in New York.

New York City initially did not mark numbered routes within its limits. In 1932, the New York Automobile Club drafted a plan establishing alignments for several routes through the city. In this plan, NY 9A went south through the Bronx and into Manhattan on Broadway while US 9 used Riverdale Avenue north of 230th Street. As a result, the two routes would have had a short concurrency across Spuyten Duyvil Creek. NY 9A would have split to the south on Tenth Avenue at 218th Street in order to join the Harlem River Drive via Nagle Avenue and Dyckman Street. From there it would head west on 155th Street to Amsterdam Avenue, where it would head south to 79th Street, heading west there to rejoin US 9 at Riverside Drive. US 9 would have continued south through lower Manhattan to Staten Island via the Staten Island Ferry; however, it is unclear whether NY 9A would have continued south with US 9 to lower Manhattan.

The New York Automobile Club released another plan in 1933. This plan made no changes to NY 9A; however, US 9 was changed to use Broadway all the way through the Bronx and to travel to New Jersey by way of the Holland Tunnel. In the final plan implemented in mid-December 1934, no route was assigned to the Harlem River Drive–Amsterdam Avenue corridor. Instead, NY 9A used what had been planned as US 9, splitting at Broadway and Dyckman Street. NY 9A ran south along the west side of Manhattan on Riverside Drive and the West Side Elevated Highway (detouring around an unfinished section via 57th Street, Eleventh Avenue and 48th Street) to end at the entrance and exit plazas of the Holland Tunnel. US 9 was shifted northward to enter New Jersey via the George Washington Bridge.

Westchester County
In Westchester County, Saw Mill River Road originally followed the Saw Mill River Parkway corridor from Eastview to Hawthorne. This section of Saw Mill River Road gained a number , becoming part of NY 142, a route that began at NY 100 on the Greenburgh–Mount Pleasant town line and followed Grasslands Road, NY 9A, and Saw Mill River Road north to Hawthorne, where it rejoined NY 100. The route went unchanged until it was removed . Its former routing was split into two routes—an extended NY 141 north of NY 9A and the new NY 100C along Grasslands Road—by 1940. NY 9A was extended northward  from Tarrytown to Archville, a small hamlet midway between Tarrytown and Ossining, by way of Sleepy Hollow Road.

Farther north, a new highway was built around Ossining from Saw Mill River Road (NY 100) in Briarcliff Manor to US 9 north of Ossining. The highway, known as the Briarcliff–Peekskill Parkway, was completed  and initially designated as NY 404. On January 1, 1949, NY 9A was altered to continue north along a slightly realigned Saw Mill River Road from NY 100C near Elmsford to the south end of the Briarcliff–Peekskill Parkway in Briarcliff Manor. At this point, NY 9A left Saw Mill River Road and followed the parkway to its end at US 9, supplanting NY 404. The realignment created a  overlap between NY 9A and NY 100 from Hawthorne to Briarcliff Manor and resulted in the truncation of NY 141 back to its previous terminus in Hawthorne.

Construction on the Croton Expressway, the only piece of the failed Hudson River Expressway project that was ever built, began in the mid-1960s. It became part of a realigned US 9 when it was completed by 1967. The former surface routing of US 9 along Albany Post Road between Croton-on-Hudson and Buchanan became a northward extension of NY 9A, which reached the old alignment by way of an overlap with US 9 from the north end of the Briarcliff–Peekskill Parkway to Croton-on-Hudson.

New York City

As the Henry Hudson Parkway replaced Riverside Drive in the mid-1930s, NY 9A was moved onto it, eventually using the new parkway to where it crossed US 9 (Broadway) in the Bronx. Here, NY 9A exited the parkway and ran concurrent with US 9 to the split in Yonkers. The Brooklyn–Battery Tunnel connecting Manhattan's Battery Park to Brooklyn was completed in 1950. By 1960, an extension of the West Side Elevated Highway south to the Manhattan tunnel portal became part of NY 27A, which had ended in Brooklyn prior to the construction of the tunnel. On January 1, 1970, NY 27A was truncated on its western end to eastern Nassau County while NY 27 was extended northward over NY 27A's former routing through the Battery Tunnel and the West Side Elevated Highway.

However, by 1973, NY 27 had been cut back to its interchange with the Gowanus Expressway in Brooklyn while unsigned I-478 was assigned to both the Battery Tunnel and all of the West Side Elevated Highway south of the Lincoln Tunnel. NY 9A was cut back to the Lincoln Tunnel as a result. The extension of I-478 into Manhattan was eliminated following the collapse of part of the Elevated Highway in 1973, an event which led to the demolition of the highway south of 59th Street. Demolition was completed in 1989. NY 9A was shifted onto 12th Avenue, one of the surface streets that the Elevated Highway had run atop of, but was otherwise unaffected as the route's south end was initially kept at the Lincoln Tunnel.

In the mid-1990s, NY 9A was extended south to the Battery Tunnel by way of 12th Avenue and two other streets the Elevated Highway had previously run atop of, West Street and 11th Avenue. Construction began in early 1996 on a project to convert the section of NY 9A south of 59th Street into the West Side Highway, a six-lane urban boulevard with a parkway-style median and decorative lightposts. The first of the project's seven segments—between Clarkson and Horatio streets in the Greenwich Village neighborhood—was completed in 1998. Completion of the project was originally set for October 2001; however, it was delayed for years due to damage caused by the September 11 attacks. It was finished by 2014.

Major intersections
All exits on the Briarcliff–Peekskill Parkway and Croton Expressway are unnumbered.

See also

New Jersey Route 139, which continued NY 9A back to US 9 in Jersey City when it was US 9 Business.

References

External links

NYCRoads: Briarcliff–Peekskill Parkway – includes formerly proposed extension off NY 9A
NY 9A (Greater New York Roads)

009A
U.S. Route 9
Transportation in Manhattan
Transportation in the Bronx
Transportation in Westchester County, New York
West Side Highway